Adewale Adeyipo is a Nigerian business executive with extensive experience in Strategy, Management, and Leadership and is the CEO of Computer Warehouse Group Plc (CWG), a pan-African provider of information and communications technology company, headquarters in Lagos and operations in Cameroon, Uganda and Ghana.

Education 
Adewale holds a BSc in Computer Science from University of Ilorin, Nigeria, a Master's in Business Administration (MBA) from Business School Netherlands, He has a specialisation certificate in innovation and entrepreneurship from Harvard Business School and is an alumnus of Lagos Business School and Massachusetts Institute of Technology (MIT).

Career 
Adewale started his career as the Business Development Manager of Discount Micro Credit Finance Company, he later became the Sales Manager for E-Peak Systems Nigeria in 2008 and moved to CWG Plc as a business director in 2009.  He was the Executive director for Sales and Marketing, Marketing and Product Management within the CWG Group. He led the CWG Plc PAN Africa Initiatives (PAI).

References 

Nigerian chief executives
University of Ilorin alumni
Lagos Business School alumni
Businesspeople in information technology
Massachusetts Institute of Technology alumni